The Winston-Salem Fire Department (WSFD) provides fire protection to the city of Winston-Salem, North Carolina. The history of the WSFD dates back to 1913 when the cities of Winston and Salem merged to form the city of Winston-Salem and gave birth to the Winston-Salem Fire Department.

History
The earliest precursor to the Winston-Salem Fire Department was the Salem Fire Department, created after the construction of the Salem Church. In 1782, the fire inspection service was created to ensure that chimneys were properly being swept. If an infraction was found, the fire inspector could issue fines of up to $1 per day until the owner fixed the issue. 

In 1951, the Winston-Salem Fire Department became the first integrated department in North Carolina. Eight total firefighters were hired to integrate the department. By 1967, the department was fully integrated.

Incidents
On January 31, 2022, Weaver Fertilizer Plant caught fire in North Winston-Salem, prompting a major response from the department. Chief Mayo said that hundreds of personnel were involved in fighting the fire, and over 4 million gallons of water were used. The plant had large stores of ammonium nitrate, which made the fire especially dangerous to fight. “At the beginning of this incident, there was enough ammonium nitrate on hand for this to be one of the worst explosions in U.S. history,” Winston-Salem Fire Chief Trey Mayo said two days after the fire began. Records show that the amount of chemicals onsite were over 4.5 million pounds. Fear of explosion caused the fire department and Winston-Salem Police Department to evacuate over 6,000 individuals, and close several businesses.  Because of the work of the fire department, the plant did not explode. The cause of the fire is still under investigation as of June 2022.

Stations and apparatus 
 this is the current list of stations and apparatus:

References

Fire departments in North Carolina
Government agencies established in 1913
1913 establishments in North Carolina